Jone Koroiduadua (born 10 March 1999) is a Fijian rugby union player, currently playing for the . His preferred position is prop.

Professional career
Koroiduadua was named in the Fijian Drua squad for the 2022 Super Rugby Pacific season. He had previously represented the Drua in the 2019 National Rugby Championship.

References

External links
 

1999 births
Living people
Fijian rugby union players
Rugby union props
Fijian Drua players